Wardell House is located in Shrewsbury, Monmouth County, New Jersey, United States. The house was built in 1764 and was added to the National Register of Historic Places on July 24, 1974.

See also
National Register of Historic Places listings in Monmouth County, New Jersey

References

Houses on the National Register of Historic Places in New Jersey
Houses completed in 1764
Houses in Monmouth County, New Jersey
National Register of Historic Places in Monmouth County, New Jersey
New Jersey Register of Historic Places
1764 establishments in New Jersey
Shrewsbury, New Jersey